The Château de Zuthove is a historic manor in Renescure, Nord, France.

It was built in 1472. It has been listed as an official monument since 1946.

References

Châteaux in Nord (French department)
Houses completed in 1472
Monuments historiques of Nord (French department)